Viðar Örn Kjartansson (born 11 March 1990) is an Icelandic professional footballer who plays as a striker for Super League Greece club Atromitos.

Club career
Viðar made his debut for Selfoss in 2006, aged 16. He joined Icelandic top division club ÍBV in 2009 but rejoined Selfoss after a short stint with ÍBV.

He joined Icelandic club Fylkir in 2013 and after a very prolific goalscoring season in the Icelandic top flight, he joined Norwegian club Vålerenga in December 2013. Viðar scored his first goal for Vålerenga in a 3–1 home win over Bodø/Glimt on 6. April 2014.

After his first year in Norway, Viðar ended up as the top scorer in the Norwegian top league with 25 goals scored in 29 games.

On 22 January 2015, Viðar transferred to Chinese Super League side Jiangsu Guoxin-Sainty. Jiangsu Guoxin-Sainty signed him for €3.5 million. On 7 March 2015, he made his debut and scored his first goal for Jiangsu in the first league match of the 2015 season which Jiangsu Sainty lost to Shanghai SIPG 2–1.

Viðar played a vital part in the Chinese FA cup, and was the club's top goalscorer in the cup with four goals, which helped Jiangsu to win their first trophy in history of the club.

On 27 January 2016, he signed for Swedish club Malmö FF.

On 30 August 2016, he transferred to Israeli club Maccabi Tel Aviv. He signed a four-year deal with the club. On 26 October 2016, Viðar won the Swedish championship as Malmö FF sealed the title in his absence.

On 31 August 2018, he signed a four-year contract with the Russian Premier League club FC Rostov, joining his compatriots Ragnar Sigurðsson, Björn Bergmann Sigurðarson and Sverrir Ingi Ingason at the club. He scored his first two goals for the club on 26 September 2018 in a Russian Cup 4–0 victory over a third-tier club FC Syzran-2003.

On 18 March 2019, Viðar signed a five-month loan deal with Hammarby IF in Allsvenskan.

On 20 July 2019, he joined Russian club FC Rubin Kazan on loan for the 2019–20 season. He played 16 league games and scored one goal during the first half of the season, as Rubin Kazan was placed 13th in the table, before terminating his loan deal on 11 January 2020. On 27 January 2020, Rostov announced that he was loaned to Turkish club Yeni Malatyaspor.

On 28 August 2020, he returned to Vålerenga and signed a contract until 2023.

On 1 August 2022, he joined Atromitos on a two-year deal. He scored in his debut against OFI, helping to a 3–1 home win in the season's opener season's opener.

International career
Viðar made his senior international debut for Iceland in 2014, starting as a centre forward in a friendly against Austria. He scored his first international goal in a friendly against the United Arab Emirates in January 2016. Despite a strong run for his club team Malmö FF, Viðar was overlooked for a spot in Iceland's Euro 2016 squad and instead put on the team's standby list. His second international goal came in a friendly against Qatar in November 2017. Viðar once again missed out on playing in an international championship, when he was left out of Iceland's World Cup 2018 squad, serving as a non-squad reserve.

Viðar announced his retirement from international duty in October 2018 at the age of 28, having won 19 caps and scored two goals.

In March 2019, Viðar reversed his decision to retire from the national team and was called up to represent Iceland in the UEFA Euro 2020 qualifying games against Andorra and France.

Career statistics

Club

International
Scores and results list Iceland's goal tally first, score column indicates score after each Viðar goal.

Honours

Jiangsu Sainty
Chinese FA Cup: 2015

Malmö FF
Allsvenskan: 2016

Maccabi Tel Aviv
Toto Cup: 2017–18

Individual
Úrvalsdeild Top goalscorer: 2013
Eliteserien Forward of the Year: 2014
Eliteserien Top goalscorer: 2014
Norwegian Cup Top goalscorer: 2014
 Allsvenskan Forward of the Year: 2016
Israeli Premier League Top goalscorer: 2016–17
ONE magazine player of the week: January 2018

References

External links

 
 
 

1990 births
Living people
Association football forwards
Vidar Orn Kjartansson
Vidar Orn Kjartansson
Vidar Orn Kjartansson
Vidar Orn Kjartansson
Vidar Orn Kjartansson
Vidar Orn Kjartansson
Vålerenga Fotball players
Jiangsu F.C. players
Malmö FF players
Maccabi Tel Aviv F.C. players
FC Rostov players
Hammarby Fotboll players
FC Rubin Kazan players
Yeni Malatyaspor footballers
Atromitos F.C. players
Vidar Orn Kjartansson
Expatriate footballers in Norway
Vidar Orn Kjartansson
Expatriate footballers in China
Vidar Orn Kjartansson
Expatriate footballers in Sweden
Vidar Orn Kjartansson
Expatriate footballers in Israel
Expatriate footballers in Russia
Vidar Orn Kjartansson
Expatriate footballers in Turkey
Vidar Orn Kjartansson
Expatriate footballers in Greece
Vidar Orn Kjartansson
Chinese Super League players
Allsvenskan players
Israeli Premier League players
Russian Premier League players
Süper Lig players
Eliteserien players
Vidar Orn Kjartansson
Vidar Orn Kjartansson
Vidar Orn Kjartansson
Super League Greece players